S. grandiflora  may refer to:
 Sageraea grandiflora, a plant species endemic to India
 Sarcolaena grandiflora, a plant species endemic to Madagascar
 Sesbania grandiflora, the agati, hummingbird tree or scarlet wisteria, a small tree species
 Solandra grandiflora, a chalice vine species
 Sophronitis grandiflora, an orchid species found from Brazil to Argentina
 Stanhopea grandiflora, an orchid species found from Trinidad to southern tropical America
 Stapelia grandiflora, a flowering plant species

Synonymms
 Stypandra grandiflora, a synonym for Stypandra glauca, a rhizomatous perennial plant species found in Australia

See also
 Grandiflora (disambiguation)